Kaiin is the name of:

 All-Japan Seamen's Union
 A place in The Dying Earth